Renaud Hoffman (1895–1952) was a German-born American film director, screenwriter and producer of the silent and early sound era. He directed the 1929 musical Blaze o' Glory.

Selected filmography

 Strangers of the Night (1923)
 The Legend of Hollywood (1924)
 Which Shall It Be? (1924)
 One of the Bravest (1925)
 His Master's Voice (1925)
 Private Affairs (1925)
 The Unknown Soldier (1926)
 The Block Signal (1926)
 The Phantom of the Forest (1926)
 The Silent Power (1926)
 The Sign of the Claw (1926)
 King of the Pack (1926)
 Racing Blood (1926)
 A Harp in Hock (1927)
 Heroes of the Night (1927)
 Stool Pigeon (1928)
 Blaze o' Glory (1929)
 The Climax (1930)
 Our Neighbors – The Carters (1939)

References

Bibliography
 Bradley, Edwin M. The First Hollywood Musicals: A Critical Filmography of 171 Features, 1927 through 1932. McFarland, 2004.

External links

1895 births
1952 deaths
American film directors
German film producers
American screenwriters
German screenwriters
German male screenwriters
American film producers
German film directors
German emigrants to the United States
20th-century American screenwriters